The Second Battle of Zrínyiújvár was fought on November 27, 1663, as part of the Austro-Turkish War (1663–1664), between the Kingdom of Hungary and the Kingdom of Croatia under the command of Ban Miklós Zrínyi and an Ottoman army. The battle took place near Zrínyiújvár (Zrínyi family's fortress) in present-day Croatia and was a Hungarian-Croatian victory.

References

Sources
Ferenc Tóth, Saint Gotthard 1664, une bataille Européenne, Éditions Lavauzelle, 2007. 
Sándor Szilágyi, A Magyar Nemzet Története IV. fejezet

Conflicts in 1663
Battles involving Hungary
Battles involving Croatia
Battles of the Ottoman–Hungarian Wars
Battles involving the Ottoman Empire
Battles of the Austro-Turkish War (1663–64)
Military history of Croatia
17th century in Hungary
1663 in the Ottoman Empire
History of Somogy County